Calabrian Tarantella (in italian: Tarantella Calabrese or "Sonu a ballu": playing for dancing) is a generic term to include different musical-dancing expressions  spread in Calabrian peninsula and different from other southern Italian dances called simply Tarantella.
It is played and danced during religious festivals and other social occasions. In recent times the tradition has been revived as new groups are taking an interest in instruments which had been falling into obscurity; they played "ad usu anticu" (in the old/traditional way) or they modernised the sound adding a bassline or new sounds.

Musical instruments 
Musical instruments of Calabrian Tarantella are: zampogna, substituted often by organetto, with tamburello, in some areas was used Zampogna with Pipita and Fischiotta, while in Locride e Monte Poro was used calabrian lira. Rhythm is based on terzine with time in 12/8 and sometimes in 6/8.

Although there is homogeneity in Tarantella played and danced in all Calabria, there are some geographical differences: there is libera in east catanzarese, sonu a ballu in Aspromonte and Zumparieddu in Sila and Viddanedda in Reggio Calabria and style differences: fimminina (female style), masculina (male style), libera.

Dance 

Tarantella calabrese is a man-women couple dance, but it could be also man-man and woman-woman, in a circular space made of moving people named "rota" (wheel).
"U mastru i ballu" (Master of dance) decide the order of the dancers inside rota managed turns.
Players  outside rota follow and feel dancers and change music rhythm.
In the past, during dancing, the people created a unique rota in the square where they danced.

Main calabrian Tarantella festivals  

Paleariza at Bova (RC) since 1997
Kaulonia Tarantella Festival at Caulonia (RC) since 2008
Tarantella Power at Caulonia since 1998 to 2007 and since 2009 to Badolato (RC)
Radici Sonore at Tiriolo (CZ) since 2006
Radicazioni Festival at Alessandria del Carretto (CS) since 2003
Tamburello Festival at Zambrone (VV) since 2004
Sùanu 'e canna at Sant'Andrea Apostolo dello Ionio since 2010
Satrianella Festival at Satriano (CZ)  since 2009

See also
Music of Calabria

External links 
Tarantella calabrese
Conservatorio di Musica Popolare della Calabria
Liuteria tradizionale (A.R.P.A.)
Radici Sonore Festival at Tiriolo
Tarantella Power at Badolato
Kaulonia tarantella Festival at Caulonia
Progetto Sentieri del Suono
Articolo sulla Viddanedda
Tarantella Calabrese Video

Italian folk dances
Partner dance
Music of Calabria
Articles containing video clips